Sergeant William Henry Harrison Crosier (May 5, 1844 to March 14, 1903) was an American soldier who fought in the American Civil War. Crosier received the country's highest award for bravery during combat, the Medal of Honor, for his action during the Battle of Peachtree Creek in Georgia on 20 July 1864. He was honored with the award on 12 January 1892.

Biography
Crosier was born in Skaneateles, New York on 5 May 1844. He enlisted into the 149th New York Infantry. He died on 14 March 1903 and his remains are interred at the Oakwood Cemetery.

Medal of Honor citation

See also

List of American Civil War Medal of Honor recipients: A–F

References

1844 births
1903 deaths
People of New York (state) in the American Civil War
Union Army officers
United States Army Medal of Honor recipients
American Civil War recipients of the Medal of Honor
Burials at Oakwood Cemetery (Syracuse, New York)